Austin station is a train station located just west of downtown Austin, Texas, United States.  The station is served by Amtrak's Texas Eagle route, which runs north to Chicago and west to Los Angeles. Trains pass daily at 9am and 5pm

History
The brick depot was built in 1947 for the Missouri Pacific Railroad and provides a small waiting room, ticket office and restroom for passengers.

References

External links

Amtrak Texas Eagle Stations - Austin, TX

Austin Amtrak Station (USA Rail Guide -- Train Web)

Amtrak stations in Texas
Railway stations in the United States opened in 1947
Transportation in Austin, Texas
Former Missouri Pacific Railroad stations
Railway stations in Travis County, Texas
Buildings and structures in Austin, Texas